Polycystic kidney disease 2-like 2 protein (PKD2L2) also known as transient receptor potential polycystic 5 (TRPP5) is a protein that in humans is encoded by the PKD2L2 gene.

TRPP5 is a member of the transient receptor potential channel family of proteins.

See also
 TRPP

References

Further reading

Ion channels